The Proclamation of the Constitution Act, 1867 was a royal proclamation issued by Queen Victoria on the advice of the British government, bringing the Constitution Act, 1867 into force and creating the new country of Canada, effective July 1, 1867.

The Constitution Act, 1867 is the constitutional statute which established Canada.  Originally named the British North America Act, 1867, the Act continues to be the foundational statute for the Constitution of Canada, although it has been amended many times since 1867.  It is now recognised as part of the supreme law of Canada.

Constitution Act, 1867

The Constitution Act, 1867 is part of the Constitution of Canada and thus part of the supreme law of Canada.  It was the product of extensive negotiations by the governments of the British North American provinces in the 1860s. The Act sets out the basic constitutional structure of Canada, including creating the federal government and defining the powers of the federal government and the provinces.  Originally enacted in 1867 by the British Parliament under the name the British North America Act, 1867, in 1982 the Act was brought under full Canadian control through the Patriation of the Constitution, and was renamed the Constitution Act, 1867.  Since Patriation the Act can only be amended in Canada, under the amending formula set out in the Constitution Act, 1982.

Text of the Proclamation 

The Proclamation reads:

Purpose and interpretation
The Constitution Act, 1867 was passed by the British Parliament in March, 1867, receiving royal assent on March 29, 1867.  However, it did not come into force immediately, as time was needed to prepare for the implementation of the new federal structure, particularly the selection of the new federal Cabinet.

Section 3 of the Act authorised the Queen, on the advice of the British government, to set the date for the coming into force of the Act. The Royal Proclamation was issued on May 22, 1867, setting July 1, 1867 as the day the Act would come into force and Canada would come into existence. Governor General Lord Monck appointed John A. Macdonald as the first prime minister of Canada.  Macdonald then spent the months of May and June forming the new Cabinet, which required balancing a number of regional, sectarian, and linguistic issues.  The new federal government then came into effect on July 1, 1867.

Related provisions
Section 3 of the Act authorised the Queen to issue the Proclamation, acting on the advice of the British government.

References 

Constitution of Canada
Canadian Confederation
Federalism in Canada